Kallberg is a surname. Notable people with the surname include:

Aarne Kallberg (1891–1945), Finnish long-distance runner
Christina Källberg (born 2000), Swedish table tennis player
Per Källberg (1947–2014), Swedish cinematographer

See also
 Kalkberg